"Wake the Town and Tell the People" is a popular song with music by Jerry Livingston and lyrics by Sammy Gallop, published in 1955. This song is a wedding day number complete with the chorus imitating the sound of wedding bells, as well as the sounds of the real chimes.

The biggest-selling recordings were made by Les Baxter and Mindy Carson, both released in 1955.

Recorded versions
Les Baxter (released by Capitol Records in the United States as catalog number 3120 and in Australia as catalog number CP-422, both with the flip side "I'll Never Stop Loving You").
Rose Brennan (released 1955 by HMV Records as catalog numbers POP-112 (78 rpm) and 7M328 (45 rpm), both with the flip side "Ten Little Kisses").
Pablo Beltrán Ruiz (released by RCA Victor Records as catalog number 20-6341, with the flip side "Love Is a Many-Splendored Thing").
Jimmy Carroll's Orchestra with the Bell Ringers (released by Bell Records as catalog number 1105, with the flip side "The Yellow Rose of Texas").
Mindy Carson (released by Columbia Records as catalog number 40537, with the flip side "Hold Me Tight"; re-recorded and released in 1960 by Joy Records (New York) as catalog number 236, with the flip side "When I Fall in Love").
Bing Crosby recorded the song in 1955 for use on his radio show and it was subsequently included in the box set The Bing Crosby CBS Radio Recordings (1954-56) issued by Mosaic Records (catalog MD7-245) in 2009. 
Bethe Douglas (released September 1955 by Pye Records as catalog number N15007, with the flip side "How to Be Very, Very Popular").
Four-in-a-Chord (released November 1955 by Embassy Records as catalog number WB158, with the flip side "Twenty Tiny Fingers").
Joe Loss Orchestra (released 1955 by HMV Records as catalog numbers POP-118 (78 rpm) and 7M330 (45 rpm), both with the flip side "Button Up Your Overcoat").
Lorrae Desmond released September 1955 by Decca Records in the United Kingdom as catalog number F 10612 with the flip side "You Should Know"
Dinah Washington (released by Mercury Records in the United States as catalog number 71876 and in Australia as catalog number 45434, both with the flip side "September in the Rain").
Lawrence Welk (released 1955 in the United States by Coral Records as catalog number 61477 and in the United Kingdom by Vogue-Coral Records as catalog number 72102, both with the flip side "I Hear Those Bells").
Erni Bieler had a German hit at #11 with the rendering "Lass die Welt darüber reden" in 1956: this version has also been recorded by Liane Augustin and Lolita.
Ivo Robić recorded the song for inclusion on a 1957 four track EP single.

References

Songs with lyrics by Sammy Gallop
1955 songs
Songs written by Jerry Livingston